Bacillus selenitireducens is a bacterium first isolated from Mono Lake, California. It is notable for respiring oxyanions of selenium and arsenic. It is spore-forming, rod-shaped and alkaliphile, its type strain being MLS10.

This species has been recently transferred into the genus Salisediminibacterium. The correct nomenclature is Salisediminibacterium selenitireducens.

References

Further reading
Staley, James T., et al. "Bergey's manual of systematic bacteriology, vol. 3."Williams and Wilkins, Baltimore, MD (1989): 2250–2251.

Berkeley, Roger, et al., eds. Applications and systematics of bacillus and relatives. Wiley. com, 2008.

External links

Type strain of Bacillus selenitireducens at BacDive -  the Bacterial Diversity Metadatabase

selenitireducens
Bacteria described in 1998